Chippewa Park is a census-designated place in Stokes Township, Logan County, Ohio, United States. As of the 2010 census, the population was 891.

Geography
Chippewa Park is in northwestern Logan County, in the northeast part of Stokes Township. The CDP is located along the northern shore of Indian Lake and includes the neighborhood known as Island View. The northern edge of the CDP follows Ohio State Route 235, the eastern edge follows Blackhawk Run, the southern edge is the shore of Indian Lake, and the western edge is the border of Indian Lake State Park.

Demographics

References

Census-designated places in Logan County, Ohio